Witch Elm (1904–1923) was a Thoroughbred racehorse owned by the William Hall Walker and trained by Jack Robinson. She was a daughter of Orme, who won the Eclipse Stakes twice and her dam was Cannie Lass, who was a daughter of Ayrshire.

Racing career
She won five races out of the nine she contested as a two-year-old, including the Cheveley Park Stakes and the West of Scotland Foal Stakes at Ayr. Amongst her other races were a fifth place in the National Breeders' Produce Stakes at Sandown and a third place in the Lancashire Breeders' Produce Stakes at Liverpool. As a three-year-old she easily won the 1000 Guineas from Fragility after starting the 4/1 favourite, but could not repeat this classic winning form over longer distances.

Breeding career
Witch Elm did not produce any top racehorses, but some of her descendants became classic winners in Brazil. In 1919 Witch Elm produced the filly Lady Clarence, who was sired by Queen Alexandra Stakes winner Royal Realm. Witch Elm died in 1923 at the National Stud.

Pedigree

Note: b. = Bay, br. = Brown, ch. = Chestnut

* Witch Elm was inbred 3x4 to Galopin. This means that he appears once in the third generation and once in the fourth generation of her pedigree.

References

1904 racehorse births
1923 racehorse deaths
Racehorses bred in the United Kingdom
Racehorses trained in the United Kingdom
Thoroughbred family 4-c
1000 Guineas winners